Mell is a Japanese singer.

Mell may also refer to:

Melanie Münch (born 1981),  German singer
Mell (name), a given name and surname (including a list of people with the name)
Mell, Drogheda, a former town in Ireland
Mell, Kentucky, an unincorporated community in Kentucky, United States

See also 

 
 Mells (disambiguation)
 Mel (disambiguation)
 Arish Mell, small embayment and beach in Dorset, England
 Mag Mell, a realm in Irish mythology